MV Spiegelgracht is a general cargo ship, operated by  bevrachtingskantoor. She was launched in 1999.

Service history 
Spiegelgracht was built in Japan by the Tsuneishi Shipbuilding Company, under the construction hull number 1172. She entered service with Spliethoff's Bevrachtingskantoor, a Netherlands-based shipping company, in January 2000. Spiegelgracht is employed on numerous services for the company, including the collection of pleasure yachts from European ports – including Palma, Majorca and Southampton – in November of every year, and sailing them across the Atlantic to locations in the Caribbean for the winter cruising season. She then returns them to the Mediterranean every May for the summer cruising season.

Spiegelgracht is also used to transport a wide range of general cargo, sometimes being used on a regular service between the Baltic and North West Europe and the USA; the ship also often makes transits through the Kiel Canal between the Baltic and North Sea. In 2011 Spiegelgracht and another company ship, Deltagracht, transported disassembled wind turbines manufactured by the Danish company Vestas. Spiegelgracht carried 10 turbines from Esbjerg to Curaçao, in the Dutch Antilles, while Deltagracht carried 21 destined for Portland, Victoria.

References

External links

1999 ships
Ships built in Japan
Cargo ships of the Netherlands